Stan Startzell is a retired U.S. soccer midfielder who spent four seasons in the North American Soccer League.  He currently works in the financial services sector and is the president of the Duxbury Soccer Association.

Youth
Startzell attended Wilson Senior High School, graduating in 1968.  He then attended the University of Pennsylvania where he played on the men’s soccer team from 1969 to 1971.  He was a 1969 and 1971 second team All American and a 1970 
first team All American.  In 1971, he was second team All Ivy League as a placekicker on the Penn football team.  In 2005, the University of Pennsylvania selected Startzell to its All Century Team.

Professional
In 1972, the New York Cosmos of the North American Soccer League drafted Startzell.  He was the only native U.S. player on the roster that season.  He played three games for the Cosmos before moving to the expansion Philadelphia Atoms in 1973.  The Atoms won the league championship, but after a disappointing 1974 season, the Atoms made numerous player moves including trading Startzell to the Boston Minutemen in exchange for Alex Papadakis.  He played no games for the Minutemen and left the NASL after the 1975 season.

Post playing career
Startzell has worked with the Special Olympics and in the financial services sector.  In the mid-1980s, he worked for Selective Security Trust of America.  He currently works for Lincoln Investment Planning in Duxbury, Massachusetts where he also serves as the head of the Duxbury Soccer Association. For many years, he was also the coach of a competitive girls soccer club team called the South Coast Scorpions.

References

External links
 NASL stats
 Philadelphia Atoms player registry

1950 births
Living people
People from Snyder County, Pennsylvania
American football placekickers
American money managers
American soccer players
Boston Minutemen players
New York Cosmos players
North American Soccer League (1968–1984) players
Penn Quakers football players
Penn Quakers men's soccer players
Philadelphia Atoms players
Pittsburgh Miners players
Players of American football from Pennsylvania
Soccer players from Pennsylvania
All-American men's college soccer players
Association football midfielders